He's a Lady is an American reality television series broadcast by the Turner Broadcasting System (TBS). The series premiered on October 19, 2004, while its sixth and final episode aired on November 16, 2004. Filmed in Los Angeles, California, the series depicted eleven men in competition for a $250,000 reward over who could most convincingly pass themselves off as a woman. The contestants were required to cross-dress and adopt feminine-personas, which they introduced to their families and friends. Additionally, the contestants competed in weekly challenges that required them to embrace their femininity. The competition culminated in a beauty pageant, which was judged by a celebrity panel including Morgan Fairchild, Debbie Matenopoulos, and John Salley. The series was hosted by American television presenter Tony Frassrand.

He's a Lady was a part of TBS's intent to capitalize on a rising interest in LGBT-themed reality television shows. The series received mixed reviews from critics, who mostly found the series's premise interesting yet its execution dull. The American Family Association, a Christian fundamentalist organization, boycotted the series, in which they urged the sponsors of He's a Lady to pull their advertising and financial support. As a result, the series's principal sponsor S. C. Johnson & Son dropped their sponsorship days before the series premiered. The series premiered to 1.70 viewers, although its ratings fell over time and it was shortly cancelled. In 2004, a lawsuit was filed against TBS and Evolution Film & Tape concerning copyright infringement over the series's concept.

Format

Set in Los Angeles, the series depicted a group of eleven men in competition for a reward of $250,000. The men were initially under the guise that they were set to participate in a competition-based reality show titled All American Man, in which they would compete in a variety of physical challenges. Upon arrival to Los Angeles, however, the men were informed that they would need to cross-dress and compete in challenges where they "live like ladies" in order to win the reward. These challenges included training to be a supermodel, wedding planning, serving as a bridesmaid, and passing as a female in front of their family and friends. During the competition, the men were required to live in the Doll House, a femininely decorated dwelling intended to "help them get in touch with their feminine sides." The culmination of the show featured the men competing in a beauty pageant, in which each man was asked the following question: "What, as a lady, have you learned about being a man?” The men's performances were judged by a celebrity panel, including Morgan Fairchild, John Salley, and Debbie Matenopoulos. The series was hosted by American television presenter Tony Frassrand.

Production
TBS green-lit the series in early 2004, although its true premise was initially concealed by the network. According to executive producer Tommy Campbell, the purpose of the series was for the contestants to become more sensitive to the needs of women and therefore treat women with more respect. Following the cancellation of the LGBT-themed Fox reality television series Seriously, Dude, I'm Gay before an episode even aired, the producers of He's a Lady wanted to be proactive in order to avoid a similar fate. Executive producers Douglas Ross and Campbell claimed that they approached the media monitoring organization GLAAD to get feedback on the series in an effort to avoid offending transgender people. However, GLAAD claimed that they were the ones to contact the producers after having seen a press release about the series. After meeting with the organization, Ross and Campbell stated that GLAAD helped them become "more aware of transgender issues and the double standards of beauty."

Episodes

Reception
Originally, the show was sponsored by S.C. Johnson Wax but it was pulled out later at the last minute on claiming that an SCJ spokesperson said "We've assessed the show, and we will not sponsor it".

Lawsuit
On November 28, 2004, He's a Lady was cited in a lawsuit filed by screenwriters John Phillips and Derek Gerard. The suit targeted the series's production company, Evolution Film & Tape, alongside the series's network, TBS. The screenwriters alleged copyright infringement against the two companies, in which they claimed that He's a Lady was substantially similar to their script Sex Change in terms of "plot, themes, dialogue, mood, setting, pace, characters and sequence of events."

See also
 Cross-dressing in film and television

References

External links 
He's a Lady official site 
  
realitytvworld.com's entry

2000s American LGBT-related television series
2000s American reality television series
2000s LGBT-related reality television series
2004 American television series debuts
2004 American television series endings
Cross-dressing in television
English-language television shows
TBS (American TV channel) original programming
Television series by Evolution Film & Tape